Barrymore is a 2011 Canadian drama film written and directed by Érik Canuel and based on William Luce's 1996 play of the same name.  It stars Christopher Plummer reprising his Tony Award-winning role as John Barrymore.

Plot
Actor John Barrymore comes to terms with the ravages of his life of excess and rents an old theatre to rehearse for a backer's audition to raise funds for a revival of his 1920 Broadway hit Richard III.

Cast
Christopher Plummer as John Barrymore
John Plumpis as Frank the Prompter

Production
The film was shot at the Elgin and Winter Garden Theatres in Toronto.

Release and reception
The film premiered at the 2011 Toronto Film Festival.

David Hinckley of the New York Daily News wrote, "Plummer commands the stage as easily and firmly as Barrymore must have. He makes us believe that Barrymore would indeed, as he tries to reach deep into his past and revive Richard [III], keep recalling his wives or breaking in to sing a pop song of the day." He added, "It's exasperating, funny and sad on film, just as it was on stage." Andrew Schenker of Slant Magazine awarded the film one and a half stars out of four. David Fear of Time Out awarded the film two stars out of five. Colin Covert of the Star Tribune awarded the film three stars. Lisa Schwarzbaum of Entertainment Weekly graded the film a B.

Betsy Sharkey of the Los Angeles Times gave a negative review, writing, "It was brilliant as a one-man stage show; it was never a good candidate for film."

References

External links
 
 

Canadian drama films
English-language Canadian films
Films based on Canadian plays
Films set in 1942
Films shot in Toronto
One-character films
Films directed by Érik Canuel
2011 drama films
2011 films
2010s English-language films
2010s Canadian films